The Bird of Time is a science fiction novel by American writer Wallace West. It was published in 1959 by Gnome Press in an edition of 5,000 copies, of which 2,102 were never bound.  The novel is a fix-up of four of West's short stories that had originally appeared in the magazines Astounding and Thrilling Wonder Stories.

Plot introduction
The novel concerns the adventures of the Martian bird-woman Yahna and Earthman Bill Newsome and the conflict between their worlds.

Contents
 "En Route to Pluto"
 "The Lure of Polaris"
 "The Bird of Time"
 "Captive Audience"

Reception
Galaxy reviewer Floyd C. Gale received the novel favorably, calling it "quick-paced and deftly written," but noted that the opening segment was clearly superior to the following parts.

References

Sources

1959 American novels
Novels set on Mars
American science fiction novels
Gnome Press books